Enrique Santiago Fernández (21 March 1944 – 12 November 2003) was an Argentine footballer. He played in eight matches for the Argentina national football team in 1963. He was also part of Argentina's squad for the 1963 South American Championship.

References

External links
 

1944 births
2003 deaths
Argentine footballers
Argentina international footballers
Footballers from Rosario, Santa Fe
Association football midfielders
Club Atlético Colón managers
Rosario Central footballers
Club Atlético River Plate footballers
Millonarios F.C. players
Argentine expatriate footballers
Expatriate footballers in Colombia
Argentine football managers
Rosario Central managers